"Match Girl" (1995) is a short story by Anne Bishop, published in Ruby Slippers, Golden Tears (edited by Ellen Datlow and Terri Windling. It is a retelling of the 1845 story "The Little Match Girl" by Hans Christian Andersen.

Plot
A girl is traveling with her adopted family. They abuse her viciously and demand that she sell matches along the road. After a brutal assault, and promises of more, she escapes to another world through the light of the matches.

The impoverished girl offers her matches for sale. However, the rich passer-bys shun her on a cold wintery night, while they were on their way to a posh party.  She stays alone in the snow, lighting up matches to keep herself warm, until she eventually dies of hypothermia.  All because no one would buy her matches or feel for her plight.  The other world she finds through the light of her matches is in her dreams and imagination after the cruel world abandoned her.

External links
 Locus Magazines table of contents for Ruby Slippers, Golden Tears

Fantasy short stories
Horror short stories
Works based on The Little Match Girl